The Fruits of Enlightenment, aka Fruits of Culture (1889-90, pub. 1891) is a play by the Russian writer Leo Tolstoy. It satirizes the persistence of unenlightened attitudes towards the peasants amongst the Russian landed aristocracy. In 1891 Constantin Stanislavski achieved success when he directed the play for his Society of Art and Literature organization.

Tolstoy created the first, incomplete draft of the play in 1886, along with The Power of Darkness. Three years later, his children and wife persuaded him to complete the manuscript sufficiently for a house performance in Yasnaya Polyana. Tolstoy initially denied the proposal but quickly took the lead in directing the amateur actors; the cast included twenty six of his children, two nieces, a court prosecutor from Tula and a judge from Moscow. This first performance was on 30 December 1889. According to Sergei Tolstoy, the 1889 play deliberately reflected the realities of Yasnaya Polyana and the neighboring country estates, even using the real names of Tula gentry for the stage characters (these names were replaced with purely fictitious ones later). The first performance washed out the border between imaginary characters and the real personalities playing them, removing the fourth wall between actors and the audience; it has never since been reproduced in this form. The audience received the play well, and it was reproduced by Tula amateurs, including Tatyana Tolstaya, in April 1890, with the proceeds donated to a local orphanage. The second performance was attended by Maly theatre actor Alexander Yuzhin and independent theatre director Vladimir Nemirovich-Danchenko.

In 1891 Constantin Stanislavski directed the first public performance in Moscow for his amateur Society of Art and Literature in its theatre on Tverskaya Street. This production starred Vera Komissarzhevskaya, Maria Lilina (Stanislavski's wife), Vasily Luzhsky and Stanislavski himself as Zvezdintsev. The first truly professional performance was staged in Saint Peterburg's Alexandrinsky Theater in September 1891. The leading role of Zvezdintsev was offered to Vladimir Davydov who declined the honour and chose the lesser role of a third peasant; the second peasant wore makeup to resemble Leo Tolstoy himself, and the first peasant's makeup was designed by Ilya Repin. The show was a success and in December 1891 it premiered in Moscow's Maly theatre. Tolstoy attended Maly theatre production in January 1892 and left dissatisfied with the artists' rendition of the three peasants. The play has remained in Russian and Soviet theatre repertory ever since.

References

Sources

 Banham, Martin, ed. 1998. The Cambridge Guide to Theatre. Cambridge: Cambridge University Press. .
 Magarshack, David. 1950. Stanislavsky: A Life. London and Boston: Faber, 1986. .
 
 Yulia Rybkova (1982). Comments to the Fruits of Enlightenment (in Russian) in the 11th volume of the 22-volume set of Leo Tolstoy works

Plays by Leo Tolstoy
1889 plays